Muhammad Hanif Ramay (1930 – 1 January 2006) was an internationally renowned intellectual, painter, journalist and former Governor and Chief Minister of Punjab, and he was among the founding fathers of the Pakistan Peoples Party (PPP). He was also speaker of Punjab Assembly from October 1993 to November 1996.

Early life and education
Hanif Ramay was born in Shimla in 1930 in an Arain family. After completing B.A. honors degree from Government College Lahore (most prestigious educational institute in Lahore), later he did his Masters in Economics and Philosophy as well from Punjab University.

Ramay had an interest in politics from his college years in Lahore; he held various leadership positions in the local political scene of Lahore.

Political career
During the dictatorship of Ayub Khan in Pakistan in the 1960s, Ramay led a group of intellectuals in Lahore in developing Islamic socialist ideas, drawing on the thought of Ghulam Ahmed Perwez and Khalifa Abdul Hakim, along with Ba'athist thinkers such as Michel Aflaq. Ramay and his co-thinkers influenced Zulfikar Ali Bhutto when he founded the Pakistan Peoples Party with Jalaludin Abdur Rahim, and they were the primary ideological influence on the party's manifesto. Ramay outlined the priorities for the PPP's brand of Islamic socialism as including elimination of feudalism and uncontrolled capitalism, greater state regulation of the economy, nationalisation of major banks, industries and schools, encouraging participatory management in factories and building democratic institutions. They contextualised these policies as a modern extension of principles of equality and justice contained in the Quran and practiced under the authority of Muhammad in Medina and Mecca.

Hanif Ramay was elected member provincial assembly on PPP ticket in 1970. He was Punjab finance minister from 1972 to 1973, Punjab governor from February 1973 to March 1974 and was appointed chief minister of Punjab from 15 March 1974 to 15 July 1975. Later on, he developed differences with Zulfikar Ali Bhutto and thus was forced to resign form his position, and later imprisoned as a result of a malicious prosecution. During the same time frame he founded the left-wing newspaper Masawaat.

Exile to United States
In a self-imposed exile to evade prosecution from the military dictatorship, Hanif left for the U.S., in the late 1970s. Hanif Ramay was associated with the University of California, Berkeley in Northern California from 1980 to 1983. After the demise of his first wife (Ms. Shaheen), he married an American woman in 1992, then Joyce Murad, a widow of his close friend, and lived with her in Fort Myers, Florida (USA) for several years. Hanif was the author of many best selling Urdu and English books in Pakistan and abroad, the most famous book he ever wrote was titled Punjab ka Muqadma (Punjab's Trial).

Return to Politics
After deciding to re-enter politics in Pakistan in early 1990s, he contested in the general election from Lahore on PPP ticket, and thus after winning he was selected as the Speaker of Punjab Assembly in 1993, and he remained in that position until 1996.

Death
Ramay died on 1 January 2006 in Lahore after a prolonged illness resulting out of an accidental fall he took at his home.

References

Chief Ministers of Punjab, Pakistan
Governors of Punjab, Pakistan
1930 births
2006 deaths
Government College University, Lahore alumni
University of the Punjab alumni
Pakistan People's Party politicians
Pakistani socialists
People from Shimla